Bagh is an area of Bagh Union Council, Abbottabad Tehsil, Abbottabad District, Khyber Pakhtunkhwa, Pakistan. According to the 2017 Census of Pakistan,   the population of Bagh is 10,028. un bagh have 3 vc one is bagh which is largest vc of un bagh village serian is also part of vc bagh its population is 10,028 including population of village Serian which is 3000

References

Populated places in Abbottabad District